GIF art is a form of digital art that first emerged in 1987. The technology for the animated GIF has become increasingly advanced through the years. After 2010, a new generation of artists focused on experimenting with its potential for presenting creativity on the World Wide Web. Mass access to the Internet allowed their GIFs to travel rapidly and virally online, through social platforms such as Tumblr and Giphy, and to be recognized as a new form of art.

GIF art has been around since the year 1987, increasingly gaining attention from the audience some years after 2000. Contemporary art galleries and institutions like the Museum of the Moving Image (New York City) are popular among many young artists.

GIF art animations have been exhibited in galleries and festivals around the world. Some works are exhibited in the form of physical, lenticular printed images.

See also
 Animation
 Graphic Design
 Cinemagraph
 Computer art
 Computer graphics
 New Media Art

References

Digital art
Digital artworks